The 2018 Big Easy Tour was the eighth season of the Big Easy Tour. It was the first season in which events received Official World Golf Ranking points. Three events in 2017 were co-sanctioned with the MENA Golf Tour and attracted world ranking points.

Schedule
The following table lists official events during the 2018 season.

Order of Merit
The Order of Merit was based on prize money won during the season, calculated in South African rand. The top 10 players on the tour earned status to play on the 2019–20 Sunshine Tour.

Notes

References

2018 in golf
2018 in South African sport